Lee Eun-kyung may refer to:

 Lee Eun-kyung (volleyball) (born 1961), South Korean volleyball player
 Lee Eun-kyung (archer) (born 1972)
 Lee Eun-kyung (field hockey) (born 1972), South Korean field hockey player
 Lee Eun-gyeong (archer) (born 1997), South Korean archer
 Ri Un-gyong (born 1980), North Korean football midfielder

See also
Lee (Korean surname)
Eun-kyung, Korean feminine given name